The Lufbery was a French automobile manufactured from 1898 until around 1902.  Built by Charles-Edouard Lufbery, it was a rear-engined vee-twin which combined epicyclic gearing and three-speed belt transmission to create a primitive form of overdrive.

References
David Burgess Wise, The New Illustrated Encyclopedia of Automobiles.

Lorraine, La